The Sweet and the Bitter is a 2007 Italian crime-drama film directed by Andrea Porporati. It entered the competition at the 64th Venice International Film Festival.

Cast 
Luigi Lo Cascio as Saro Scordia
 as Mimmo Butera
Toni Gambino as Gaetano Butera
Fabrizio Gifuni as Stefano
Donatella Finocchiaro as Ada
Ornella Giusto as Antonia
Renato Carpentieri as Vicari
Luigi Lo Cascio as Saro's Father

Plot
Saro is the son of a Sicilian criminal. He visits his father during a revolt in the prison where he is one of the leaders. At the end of the occupation his father dies, presumably under the fire of the police breaking in to suppress the revolt.

References

External links

2007 films
Italian crime drama films
2007 crime drama films
2000s Italian films